Vanayi-ye Olya (also Romanized as Vanāyī-ye ‘Olyā; also known as Vanābī-ye ‘Olyā) is a village in Koregah-e Sharqi Rural District, in the Central District of Khorramabad County, Lorestan Province, Iran. At the 2006 census, its population was 18, in 4 families.

References 

Towns and villages in Khorramabad County